The Canefield Airport  is an airport on the west coast of the island nation of Dominica. Construction began in early 1979 with British funding, shortly after Dominica's independence. The airport was officially opened in 1982. It is one of only two airports in the island nation of Dominica, the other being Douglas-Charles Airport.

Runways and taxiways
It has one runway 01/19, which measures . Runway 01 has a 500-foot displaced threshold. There is mountainous terrain to the east, and rising terrain north and south, with the Caribbean sea to the west. Commercial operators require proficiency checks for their crews to be able to operate at the airport.

The airport features one three-thousand-one-hundred-and-thirty-foot runway.

Traffic
Most of these flights operate with turboprop and piston aircraft such as the DHC-6 Twin Otter, Beechcraft King Air, Freighters, and private aircraft.

Though not common, the airport has handled light business jets such as the Cessna Citation Mustang, and the Cessna Citation II on occasions. One of the largest aircraft to ever land at the airport was a Samaritan's Purse operated Basler BT-67.

Airlines and destinations

Passenger

The following airlines operate passenger flights to the Canefield Airport:

Charter
The following airlines operate charter flights into the Canefield Airport.

Cargo

Statistics

The busiest routes year round to the Canefield Airport.

Temperature Record
This is the highest temperature to have ever been recorded in Dominica.

Incidents and accidents

On Tuesday, March 1, 2011, a Rockwell Shrike Commander aircraft right main gear blew and the aircraft veered off the runway to the right. There were no injuries and this mishap is still unexplained.
On Thursday, February 16, 2012, a Cessna 402 made an emergency landing. It landed without further incident.
On Thursday, February 27, 2014, a Cessna 404 aircraft ran off the runway, suffered damage to the left wing.
On Sunday, February 8, 2015, a private Cessna 404 aircraft coming from Venezuela ran off the runway, suffered extensive damage.
On Wednesday, February 7, 2018, a Rockwell Shrike Commander aircraft upon landing suffered nose gear failure.

See also
Transport in Dominica
List of airports in Dominica

References

External links

Airports in Dominica
Airports established in 1979
1979 establishments in North America